NGC 7252 is a peculiar galaxy resulting from an interaction between two galaxies that started a billion years ago. It is located 220 million light years away in the constellation Aquarius. It is also called Atoms for Peace Galaxy, a nickname which comes from its loop-like structure, made of stars, that resembles a diagram of an electron orbiting an atomic nucleus.

Description
NGC 7252 is located in the southern part of Aquarius. With an apparent magnitude of 12.7, it is bright enough to be seen by amateur astronomers as a faint small fuzzy blob. Large loops of gas and stars around it makes the galaxy quite peculiar. Thus, it is also Arp 226 (the 226th entry in Arp's list of peculiar galaxies).

In December 1953, U.S. President Dwight D. Eisenhower gave the "Atoms for Peace" speech. The speech was concerned about promoting nuclear power for peaceful purposes instead of nuclear weapons. Significant to the scientific community, the name of the speech was given to this peculiar galaxy. The two galaxies merging also resembles nuclear fusion and the galaxies' giant loops resemble a diagram of electrons orbiting the nucleus of an atom.

The galaxy is the result of a collision of two galaxies. This collision is an opportunity for astronomers to study such mergers and to predict the future of our Milky Way after its expected collision with the Andromeda Galaxy.

X-ray emissions were observed in NGC 7252. This suggests the existence of nuclear activity or an intermediate-mass black hole in the galaxy.

Structure

The central region of the galaxy is home to hundreds of massive, ultra-luminous clusters of young stars that appear as bluish knots of light. These young clusters were created in the suspected galaxy merger, that pushed gases into these regions and caused a burst of star formation.

The most conspicuous of them is one known as W3, which has a mass of around 8*107 solar masses. This object, also the most luminous super star cluster known to date, has properties more similar to an ultra-compact dwarf galaxy and differs only from those galaxies because of its age (300–500 million years).

A pinwheel-shaped disk, rotating in a direction opposite to that of the galaxy, is found deep inside NGC 7252: it resembles a face-on spiral galaxy, yet it is only 10,000 light years across. It is believed that this pinwheel-shaped structure is a remnant of a collision between two galaxies. Within a few billion years, NGC 7252 will look like an elliptical galaxy with a small inner disk due to the exhaustion of the gases in the galaxy.

In August 2013, F. Schweizer and others published a paper in the Astrophysical Journal titled "The [O III] Nebula of the Merger Remnant NGC 7252: A Likely Faint Ionization Echo". This reports the finding of a Voorwerpje on the outskirts of the well-studied NGC 7252. The abstract states (edited): "We present images and spectra of a ~10 kpc-sized emission-line nebulosity discovered in the prototypical merger remnant NGC 7252 and dubbed the `[O III] nebula' because of its dominant [O III]_5007 line. This nebula seems to yield the first sign of episodic AGN activity still occurring in the remnant, ~220 Myr after the coalescence of two gas-rich galaxies. Its location and kinematics suggest it belongs to a stream of tidal-tail gas falling back into the remnant." It continues: "This large discrepancy suggests that the nebula is a faint ionization echo excited by a mildly active nucleus that has declined by ~3 orders of magnitude over the past 20,000–200,000 years. In many ways this nebula resembles the prototypical `Hanny's Voorwerp' near IC 2497, but its size is 3x smaller."

See also 
 NGC 7727, a similar galaxy, also in Aquarius.

References

External links

 ESA homepage for the Hubble Space telescope Pictures and information on NGC 7252
 Atoms for Peace galaxy at ESO
 Article about Atoms for Peace galaxy

Lenticular galaxies
Aquarius (constellation)
7252
68612
226